2014 President's Cup may refer to:

 2014 President of Ireland's Cup, football
 2014 President's Cup (Maldives)
 2014 President's Cup (tennis)